Wentworth Earl Miller III (born June 2, 1972) is an American-British actor and screenwriter. He rose to prominence following his starring role as Michael Scofield in the Fox series Prison Break, for which he received a nomination for the Golden Globe Award for Best Actor – Television Series Drama in 2005. He made his screenwriting debut with the 2013 thriller film Stoker. In 2014, he began playing Leonard Snart / Captain Cold in a recurring role on The CW series The Flash before becoming a series regular on the spin-off, Legends of Tomorrow.

Early life
Miller was born in Chipping Norton, Oxfordshire, England, to American parents. His mother, Roxann (née Palm), is a special education teacher, and his father, Wentworth E. Miller II, is a lawyer and teacher, who was studying at the University of Oxford on a Rhodes Scholarship at the time of Miller's birth. Miller said in 2003 that his father is black and his mother is white. His father is of African-American, Jamaican, German, and English ancestry; his mother is of Rusyn, Swedish, French, Dutch, Syrian, and Lebanese ancestry. He has two sisters, Leigh and Gillian.

Miller's family moved to Park Slope, Brooklyn, when he was a year old.  He attended Midwood High School in Brooklyn, and graduated from Princeton University in 1995 with an BA in English after completing a 116-page long senior thesis, titled "Doubling and the Identity Construct in Charlotte Perkins Gilman's 'The Yellow Wallpaper,' Jean Rhys's Wide Sargasso Sea, and Charlotte Bronte's Jane Eyre", under the supervision of Gina Dent. While at Princeton, he performed with the a cappella group the Princeton Tigertones and was a member of the Quadrangle Club and the Colonial Club.

Career

In 1995, Miller relocated to Los Angeles to pursue an acting career. He has stated that his rocky road to stardom "was a long time in the coming and there were a lot of upsets and a lot of failures and roadblocks, but I couldn't walk away from it. I needed it like I needed air, it was just something I had to do." Miller's first TV appearance was as student-turned-sea monster Gage Petronzi on Buffy the Vampire Slayer ("Go Fish", 1998).

Miller's first starring role was in 2002 as the sensitive, introverted David Scott in ABC's mini-series Dinotopia. After appearing in a few minor television roles, he moved on to co-star in the 2003 film The Human Stain, playing the younger version of the Anthony Hopkins character, Coleman Silk. He identified strongly with the core dilemma of the movie, about a black man who chooses to "pass" as white. Miller worked extensively on the role, not only in researching Anthony Hopkins, but by embarking on a four-month regimen to accurately portray Silk as a boxer. Also in 2003, he had a minor role in the film Underworld, playing a doctor and friend of the character Michael Corvin.

In 2005, Miller was cast as Michael Scofield in Fox Network's television drama Prison Break. He played the role of a gifted structural engineer who created an elaborate scheme to help his brother, Lincoln Burrows (Dominic Purcell), escape death row after being found guilty of a crime he did not commit. His character had a full upper body (front and back) tattoo. Covering both the front of Miller's torso and his back, along with both arms from shoulders to wrists, the special effects for the tattoo took over four hours to apply. His performance in the show earned him a 2005 Golden Globe Award nomination for Best Actor in a Dramatic Series. The show was finished in 2009 after four seasons, but a new nine-episode fifth season was released April 4, 2017, with Miller reprising his role.

Miller appeared in two Mariah Carey music videos, "It's Like That" as a party guest and "We Belong Together" as her love interest. Director Brett Ratner, who directed the pilot episode of Prison Break, was also signed on to direct the two Carey videos. Ratner decided to use Miller in the videos as well.

In addition, Miller guest-starred in the Season 11 premiere of Law & Order: Special Victims Unit as Detective Nate Kendall, a detective from Precinct 24 of the New York City Police Department. He also featured in Resident Evil: Afterlife, the fourth film in the commercially successful Resident Evil film series based on the video game series of the same name; Miller plays Chris Redfield, one of the protagonists of the video game series.

Miller wrote the screenplay for the film Stoker, as well as a prequel to Stoker, Uncle Charlie. He used the pseudonym Ted Foulke, later explaining, "I just wanted the scripts to sink or swim on their own." Miller's script was voted to the 2010 "Black List" of the 10 best unproduced screenplays then making the rounds in Hollywood. The film is about a teenage girl who must deal with a mysterious uncle following the death of her father. Miller described it as a "horror film, a family drama and a psychological thriller". Although influenced by Bram Stoker's Dracula, Miller has clarified that Stoker is not a vampire story. Hitchcock's Shadow of a Doubt also influenced the film but only as a jumping-off point, from which the story takes a different direction. Park Chan-wook directed, with stars Mia Wasikowska as the teenager, Nicole Kidman as the mother, and Matthew Goode as the uncle. The film was released in 2013, and received generally positive reviews from critics.

In July 2014, it was announced that Miller had joined the cast of The CW superhero series The Flash in a recurring role as Leonard Snart / Captain Cold. He made his first appearance in the fourth episode of the first season, and reprised his role on Legends of Tomorrow. These shows reunited him with his Prison Break co-star Dominic Purcell, who portrayed Mick Rory / Heat Wave. Miller exited Legends of Tomorrow as a series regular at the end of season one, but signed a contract with Warner Bros. TV to continue portraying Snart simultaneously on multiple shows in the Arrowverse.

Miller wrote the screenplay for the 2016 horror film The Disappointments Room, produced by Voltage Pictures and Killer Films. The film received negative reviews from critics. He is reportedly in negotiations to write the screenplay adaptation of the novel The Story of Edgar Sawtelle by David Wroblewski which is set to be produced by Oprah Winfrey and Tom Hanks among others.

In 2020, Wentworth announced that he was no longer interested in playing straight roles for film or television and that he would not participate in a sixth season of Prison Break if it were produced.

Personal life

Miller lives in Vancouver, British Columbia. He holds dual British and US citizenship by virtue of his birth in the United Kingdom to American parents.

In 2007, Miller denied to InStyle magazine that he was gay. However, he came out as gay in August 2013, when he posted a letter on GLAAD's website declining an invitation to attend the Saint Petersburg International Film Festival because he felt "deeply troubled" by the Russian government's treatment of its gay citizens (referring to the Russian LGBT propaganda law, enacted the previous June, which banned "propaganda of nontraditional sexual relations"). Miller wrote that he "cannot in good conscience participate in a celebratory occasion hosted by a country where people like myself are being systematically denied their basic right to live and love openly".

At the 2013 Human Rights Campaign Dinner in Seattle, Washington, Miller said he had attempted suicide multiple times as a teenager before coming out as gay. He stated: "When someone asked me if that was a cry for help, I said no, because I told no one. You only cry for help if you believe there's help to cry for." He discussed struggling in Hollywood as a closeted actor, and talked about how his involvement in the ManKind Project helped him learn about brotherhood, sisterhood, and being part of a community.

On October 17, 2016, Active Minds, a mental health charity, announced that Miller would be an ambassador for the organization. In a 2016 Facebook post, he revealed that he "[had] struggled with depression since childhood. It's a battle that's cost [him] time, opportunities, relationships, and a thousand sleepless nights." He made this emotional post in reaction to a meme of himself which poked fun at his weight gain in 2010. Miller said that his weight gain was due to him finding comfort in food as he was suicidal. Near the end of the post he provided links for organizations such as the National Suicide Prevention Lifeline and Active Minds.
Wentworth revealed he had been diagnosed with autism "a year ago" on July 27, 2021. He posted on Instagram: "This isn't something I'd change ... immediately being autistic is central to who I am. To everything I've achieved/articulated."

Filmography

Film

As Actor

As Screenwriter

As producer

Television

Video games

Music videos

Awards and nominations

References

External links

 
 
 
 
 
 Wentworth Miller Interviews on theTVaddict.com

1972 births
Living people
20th-century American male actors
21st-century American male actors
American expatriates in Canada
American male film actors
American male television actors
American male voice actors
American people of Dutch descent
American people of English descent
American people of French descent
American people of German descent
American people of Jamaican descent
American people of Lebanese descent
American people of Russian descent
American people of Swedish descent
American people of Syrian descent
British emigrants to the United States
African-American male actors
American gay actors
LGBT African Americans
LGBT Black British people
English gay actors
LGBT people from New York (state)
Male actors from New York City
Male actors from Oxfordshire
LGBT and suicide
Mental health activists
People from Chipping Norton
People from Park Slope
People on the autism spectrum
Princeton University alumni
20th-century African-American people
21st-century African-American people
English LGBT actors